Justine Verdier (born in Paris) is a French pianist.

Life
French pianist Justine Verdier was born in 1985, in Paris. She began playing piano at the age of four and a half at the Musical Institute of Paris with Michel Denis. Verdier studied with Prof. Karl-Heinz Kämmerling and Pavel Gililov at the Mozarteum University in Salzburg where she gained a master's degree with honors. She has won the "Bärenreiter" Prizewinner at the 10th International Mozart Competition in Salzburg. Currently, she lives in Madrid, Spain.

References

External links
Official website
Interview with French pianist Justine Verdier

21st-century French women classical pianists
1985 births
Living people
Musicians from Paris
École Normale de Musique de Paris alumni
Conservatoire de Paris alumni